is a railway station in the town of Taketoyo, Chita District, Aichi Prefecture, Japan, operated by Meitetsu.

Lines

Station layout
Age Station has two opposed side platforms connected by a level crossing.  The station has automated ticket machines, Manaca automated turnstiles and is unattended.

Platforms

Adjacent stations

Station history
Age Station was opened on July 1, 1932, as a station on the Chita Railway. The Chita Railway became part of the Meitetsu group on February 2, 1943.  In 2007, the Tranpass system of magnetic fare cards with automatic turnstiles was implemented.

Passenger statistics
In fiscal 2018, the station was used by an average of 583 passengers daily (boarding passengers only).

Surrounding area
Japan National Route 247
Taketoyo Town Folk Historical Museum

See also
 List of Railway Stations in Japan

References

External links

 Official web page

Railway stations in Japan opened in 1932
Railway stations in Aichi Prefecture
Stations of Nagoya Railroad
Taketoyo